Corey House may refer to:

Knight-Corey House, Boothbay, Maine, listed on the NRHP in Maine
Timothy Corey House No. 1, Brookline, MA, listed on the NRHP in Massachusetts
Timothy Corey House No. 2, Brookline, MA, listed on the NRHP in Massachusetts
Corey House (Bridger, Montana), listed on the NRHP in Montana
Corey Farm, Dublin, NH, listed on the NRHP in New Hampshire
Corey House/Hotel, Grove, OK, listed on the NRHP in Oklahoma